Aleinikov (masculine) or Aleinikova (feminine) is a Russian surname. It is also transliterated as Aleynikov/Aleynikova. Notable people with the surname include:

Sergei Aleinikov, Belarusian footballer
Sergey Aleynikov, computer programmer
Vasili Aleynikov (born 1995), Russian footballer
Yevgeni Aleinikov, Russian sport-shooter

Russian-language surnames